

This is a list of the National Register of Historic Places listings in Bennett County, South Dakota.

This is intended to be a complete list of the properties on the National Register of Historic Places in Bennett County, South Dakota, United States. The locations of National Register properties for which the latitude and longitude coordinates are included below, may be seen in a map.

There is 1 property listed on the National Register in the county.

Current listings

|}

See also

 National Register of Historic Places listings in South Dakota

References

 
Bennett County